The Chambermaid is a 2018 Mexican drama film directed by Lila Avilés. It was selected as the Mexican entry for the Best International Feature Film at the 92nd Academy Awards, but it was not nominated. Working at an upscale Mexican hotel, a maid seeks to find her place in the world.

Plot
Eve  is a reserved young woman working as a maid in an upscale hotel in Mexico City. Her boss tells her that because of her good work she might soon be eligible for a promotion, cleaning one of the more exclusive floors.

One of her male co-workers asks her to look on a guest who requested a woman specifically. The guest turns out to be an overwhelmed mother who asks Eve to watch her baby while she showers. Eve begins helping the woman once a day, reluctantly growing closer to both the guest and her baby. The guest is from Argentina and at one point suggests Eve to move back with her, however returning one day Eve discovers that the woman has abruptly left.

Eve takes GED classes offered by the hotel. Initially shy, she befriends one of her classmates, Minotoy, who encourages her to open up and have fun. Eve begins to depend on Minotoy to help her. Eve's teacher gives her a copy of Jonathan Livingston Seagull by Richard Bach and she begins reading for pleasure for the first time.

A window cleaner keeps making advances towards Eve but she repeatedly ignores him. After opening up to others, she decides to seduce him one day. While she is inside cleaning a room and he is outside cleaning a window, she strips down and masturbates in front of him.

Things begin to go wrong for Eve. The GED class is shut down. The window cleaner ignores her. She finally receives news that a red dress left behind by a guest is finally hers, but when she goes to collect it, she learns that Minotoy has received the promotion she longed for.

Eve goes to the 42nd floor, the site of Minotoy's promotion, and examines the private suite.

Cast
 Gabriela Cartol as Eve
 Agustina Quinci
 Teresa Sánchez as Minotoy

Reception
On Metacritic, The Chambermaid holds an 81/100 average on 12 reviews, which indicates 'Universal Acclaim'.

Awards

See also
 List of submissions to the 92nd Academy Awards for Best International Feature Film
 List of Mexican submissions for the Academy Award for Best International Feature Film

References

External links
 

2018 films
2018 drama films
2010s Spanish-language films
Films set in hotels
Mexican drama films
2010s Mexican films